Lady Margaret Fortescue  (13 December 1923 – 25 May 2013) was a British huntswoman, and one of the country's largest private landowners, including the Castle Hill estate and  of Exmoor.

Early life

Lady Margaret Fortescue was born on 13 December 1923 at Ebrington Manor, Chipping Campden, Gloucestershire, the elder daughter of Hugh Fortescue, 5th Earl Fortescue (1888–1958), and his wife, the Hon. Margaret Helen Fortescue, née Beaumont (1892–1958), the daughter of Wentworth Beaumont, 1st Viscount Allendale. She was educated at home by governesses in Castle Hill, followed by a Swiss finishing school.

Career

During the Second World War, Fortescue worked in London's War Office as a secretary, and living in a Belgravia flat in known as "The Hovel", as well as in Cairo.

Fortescue was well known for riding side saddle. Fortescue was a fearless rider, and had several falls, and "after consulting her doctor and swallowing a few painkillers with wine, she almost invariably carried on".

In the 1950, she travelled by private train, "with horses, grooms and a retinue of staff on board."

On her father's death in 1958, she inherited the Castle Hill estate, and became one of the country's largest private landowners.

Fortescue served as a Deputy Lieutenant of Devon.

Personal life
On 31 July 1948, Fortescue married Bernard Henry Richard Harcourt van Cutsem (1916–1975), the racehorse trainer and breeder.

They had two daughters, and the elder one Eleanor (b. 1949), married Arthur Gore, 9th Earl of Arran. She had two stepsons from van Cutsem's first marriage. In 1966, she left van Cutsem, resumed her maiden name, and they divorced in 1968.

Later life
She died at the Garden House, Castle Hill, Filleigh, on 25 May 2013, and was survived by her two daughters.

References

1923 births
2013 deaths
Van Cutsem family
People from Chipping Campden
Deputy Lieutenants of Devon
Daughters of British earls
People from North Devon (district)